"That's What Friends Are For (The Vulture Song)" is a song in the Walt Disney film The Jungle Book from 1967. It was sung by a quartet of "mop top" vultures who are making friends with Mowgli, the main character of the film.  The song was written by Disney staff songwriters, Robert and Richard Sherman, and sung primarily by J. Pat O'Malley, Lord Tim Hudson, Digby Wolfe, and Chad Stuart. Bruce Reitherman and George Sanders both made cameo appearances in the song singing as Mowgli and Shere Khan the tiger, respectively, in different parts. In the soundtrack album, The Mellomen member Bill Lee replaced the unavailable Sanders.

Composing
The Shermans were brought onto the film by Walt Disney, who felt that the film in keeping with Rudyard Kipling's book was too dark for family viewing.  In a deliberate effort to keep the score light, this song as well as the Sherman Brothers' other contributions to the score generally concern darker subject matter than the accompanying music would suggest. In the case of "That's What Friends Are For", the vultures sing in the style of a barbershop quartet, making their song endearing to Mowgli - and that much more dangerous. The lyrics feature many double entendres regarding how the vultures eat other animals. The song was originally conceived as a rock and roll song, sung by the quartet of vultures. The vultures were even designed based on The Beatles, with moptop haircuts and mock-Liverpool accents, and would be voiced by the band, which did not come into fruition due to problems with their schedule. During production Disney decided the 1960s style rock would cause the song to be considered dated later, leading "We're Your Friends" to be changed to the barbershop quartet that appears in the film.

References

Songs about friendship
1967 songs
Songs from The Jungle Book (1967 film)
Songs written by the Sherman Brothers